421 class may refer to:

British Rail Class 421
CIE 421 Class
New South Wales 421 class locomotive